Robin Brownlee is a Canadian hockey writer and columnist.  He covered the Edmonton Oilers of the National Hockey League for the Edmonton Journal and the Edmonton Sun from 1989 to 2007 and later for Canadian Press and NHL.com. He appeared regularly on TSN 1260 sports radio as co-host of the Jason Gregor Show from 2009 to 2018. Brownlee wrote for the Edmonton Journal from 1989 to 2000 and for the Edmonton Sun from December 2000 until January 2007 as the newspaper's senior hockey writer. Brownlee currently writes for OilersNation. Since 2019, he has co-hosted The Outsiders podcast weekly with broadcast veteran Bryn Griffiths in Edmonton.

References 

1958 births
Living people
Canadian male journalists
Canadian male non-fiction writers
Canadian sportswriters
Journalists from Alberta
Writers from Edmonton